Curtis Jackson (born 23 March 1967 in Bermuda) is a Bermudian cricketer. To date, he has played one first-class match for Bermuda, against Kenya in the 2005 ICC Intercontinental Cup. He has also played one List A match against Guyana in 2000.

References
Cricket Archive profile
Cricinfo profile

1967 births
Living people
Bermudian cricketers